Country Code: +56
International Call Prefix: 1xx0
Trunk prefix: 0
 
These are the Chilean Carrier Selection Codes.

Astro 	151
AT & T Chile Long Distance	155
AT & T Chile Networks 	110
Bell South 	181
Carrier 159 Gtd Long Distance 	159
Carrier 169 	169
Claro Chile 	171
Concert Chile 	119
Convergia Chile 	112
Empresa de Telecomunicaciones Netonone 	115
Empresa de Transporte de Señales 	177
Empresa Nacional de Telecomunicaciones 	123
E-Newcarrier.com Chile 	114
ENTEL  	123
Equant Chile 	125
Globus 	120
GSP Chile 	124
Heilsberg 	116
Impsat Chile 	170
Manquehue 	122
MiCarrier Telecomunicaciones 	154
NetChile 	176
Smartel	165
STEL-CHILE S.A 	153
Sur Telecomunicaciones 	127
Telefónica CTC 	188
Telefónica del Sur 	121
Transam Comunicaciones 	113
Visat Telecomunicaciones 	180
VTR 	111

See also
Telephone numbers in Chile

References